Meghimatium is a genus of medium to large air-breathing land slugs, terrestrial pulmonate gastropod mollusks in the family Philomycidae and the superfamily Arionoidea, the roundback slugs.

Species
Species within the genus Meghimatium include:
 Meghimatium burchi Tsai & Wu, 2008 — from Taiwan
 Meghimatium bilineatum (Benson, 1842) — from Taiwan
 Meghimatium fruhstorferi (Collinge, 1901) — from Taiwan
 Meghimatium pictum (Stoliczka, 1873) — from Taiwan
 Meghimatium rugosum (Chen & Gao, 1982) — from Taiwan
 Meghimatium striatum Hasselt, 1824 — from Java
 Meghimatium uniforme Laidlaw, 1937 — from North Borneo

References

Further reading 
 Tsai C. L., Lin H. H. & Wu S. K. (2005). "Comparison of four philomycid slugs (Gastropoda: Stylommatophora: Philomycidae) of Taiwan". Endem. Spec. Res. 7: 41-49. PDF.

Philomycidae
Taxa named by Johan Conrad van Hasselt
Gastropod genera